Filip Serečin (born 4 October 1989) is a Slovak football striker who plays for Tállya.

Career

MFK Zemplín Michalovce
Serečin joined MFK Zemplín Michalovce in August 2010 on a half-year loan from MFK Košice, and his move has been made permanent in a winter 2011 on a two-year contract.

MFK Ružomberok
On 9 August 2011 Serečin signed a four-year contract with Slovak club MFK Ružomberok.

Shakhter Karagandy
On 1 July 2016, Serečin for Shakhter Karagandy.

References

External links
 
 Futbalnet profile ]

1989 births
Living people
Sportspeople from Košice
Slovak footballers
Slovak expatriate footballers
Association football forwards
FC VSS Košice players
MFK Zemplín Michalovce players
MFK Ružomberok players
FC Lokomotíva Košice players
FK Humenné players
FC Urartu players
FC Shakhter Karagandy players
FC Košice (2018) players
Partizán Bardejov players
Tállya KSE players
Slovak Super Liga players
Armenian First League players
Kazakhstan Premier League players
2. Liga (Slovakia) players
3. Liga (Slovakia) players
5. Liga players
Megyei Bajnokság I players
Expatriate footballers in Armenia
Slovak expatriate sportspeople in Armenia
Expatriate footballers in Kazakhstan
Slovak expatriate sportspeople in Kazakhstan
Expatriate footballers in Hungary
Slovak expatriate sportspeople in Hungary